State Highway 6 (West Bengal) is a state highway in West Bengal, India.

Route
SH 6 originates from Rajnagar and passes through Chandrapur, Suri, Purandarpur, Ahmadpur, Labhpur, Kirnahar, Kandra, Ketugram, Katwa, Nabadwip, Kalna, Jirat, Saptagram (from here it is the old Grand Trunk Road), Chinsurah, Chandannagar, Bhadreswar, Baidyabati, Serampore, Konnagar, Uttarpara, Bally, Belur, Salkia, Shibpur, Podrah, Andul and terminates at its junction with NH 16 at Alampur.

The total length of SH 6 is 266 km.

Districts traversed by SH 6 are:
Birbhum district (0 – 76 km)Purba Bardhaman district (76 – 169 km)Hooghly district (169 – 242 km)Howrah district (242-266)

Road sections
It is divided into different sections as follows:

See also
List of state highways in West Bengal

References

State Highways in West Bengal
Transport in Birbhum district